The Castle is the descriptive name for a summit in the Tatoosh Range which is a sub-range of the Cascade Range. It is located in Lewis County of Washington state. Situated in Mount Rainier National Park, The Castle is 0.2 mile immediately east of Pinnacle Peak. Precipitation runoff from The Castle drains into tributaries of the Cowlitz River.

Climbing

The Pinnacle Saddle Trailhead is located at Reflection Lakes and the trail to the saddle is over a mile in length. From the saddle, a climber's path traverses the south slope of Pinnacle Peak. Reaching the summit of The Castle is minimum class 4 scrambling, with  climbing options.

Climate
The Castle is located in the marine west coast climate zone of western North America. Most weather fronts originate in the Pacific Ocean, and travel northeast toward the Cascade Mountains. As fronts approach, they are forced upward by the peaks of the Cascade Range (Orographic lift), causing them to drop their moisture in the form of rain or snowfall onto the Cascades. As a result, the west side of the Cascades experiences high precipitation, especially during the winter months in the form of snowfall. During winter months, weather is usually cloudy, but, due to high pressure systems over the Pacific Ocean that intensify during summer months, there is often little or no cloud cover during the summer. Because of maritime influence, snow tends to be wet and heavy, resulting in high avalanche danger.

References

External links
 The Castle weather forecast
 National Park Service web site: Mount Rainier National Park
 The Castle: YouTube

Gallery

Cascade Range
Mountains of Lewis County, Washington
Mountains of Washington (state)
Mount Rainier National Park
North American 1000 m summits